Redwood is a census-designated place and unincorporated community located southeast of Twin Lake in Warren County, Mississippi, United States. The town is located near the junction of U.S. Route 61 and Mississippi Highway 3, approximately 10 miles north of Vicksburg. Its zip code is 39156.

Redwood is best known for being the site of the ancient Fort Saint-Pierre which was built by French colonialists of La Louisiane française in 1719. The French fort was destroyed by Native Americans in 1729.

Redwood is part of the Vicksburg Micropolitan Statistical Area.

It was first named as a CDP in the 2020 Census which listed a population of 84.

Demographics

2020 census

Note: the US Census treats Hispanic/Latino as an ethnic category. This table excludes Latinos from the racial categories and assigns them to a separate category. Hispanics/Latinos can be of any race.

References

Unincorporated communities in Mississippi
Unincorporated communities in Warren County, Mississippi
Census-designated places in Warren County, Mississippi
New France
Colonial United States (French)
French forts in the United States